Ted Freyer (20 May 1910 – 22 April 1984) was an Australian rules footballer who played with Essendon in the VFL during the 1930s.

Family
The sixth of the seven children of Peter Henry Freyer (1869-1945), and Mary Freyer (1871-1928), née Suffolk, Edward Laurence Freyer was born at Port Melbourne, Victoria on 20 May 1910.

He married Elsie Olivia Holmes (1911-2001) in 1930.

His brother, Bill Freyer, played VFL football with South Melbourne and Footscray in the mid-1920s, and his son, Robert Alan Freyer (1937-2011), played for Port Melbourne in the VFA between 1958 and 1965.

Football

Essendon (VFL)
Freyer usually played in the forward pocket and topped Essendon's goalkicking in consecutive seasons from 1931 until 1934 and again in 1936.

He kicked 12 goals in one match in 1935  he kicked 12.1 (73) against Melbourne, at the MCG, on 27 April 1935  8 goals once (1934), 7 goals four times (1931, 1934, 1935, and 1937), and  6 goals seven times (1931 (twice), 1933, 1936 (3 times), and 1937).

Port Melbourne (VFA)
In 1938, Freyer transferred Port Melbourne in the VFA without a clearance, at the start of the VFA's throw-pass era. He was a prolific goalkicker at Port Melbourne, and in 84 games managed 464 goals. In 1940, Freyer kicked 157 goals for Port, including 12 goals in the second semi-final and the Grand Final, to lead the VFA goalkicking for the season.

Military service
He served with the Australian army in New Guinea in World War Two.

Death
He died at Smeaton, Victoria on 22 April 1984

Notes

References
 Maplestone, M., Flying Higher: History of the Essendon Football Club 1872–1996, Essendon Football Club, (Melbourne), 1996. 
 World War Two Nominal Roll: Private Edward Lawrence (sic) Freyer (VX126742), Department of Veterans' Affairs.
 B883, VX126742: World War Two Service Record: Private Edward Lawrence (sic) Freyer (VX126742), National Archives of Australia.

External links
 
 
 Ted Fryer, at The VFA Project.

1910 births
1984 deaths
Australian rules footballers from Melbourne
Australian Rules footballers: place kick exponents
Essendon Football Club players
Port Melbourne Football Club players
People from Port Melbourne
Australian military personnel of World War II
Military personnel from Melbourne